Nebria dolicapax is a species of ground beetle from Nebriinae family that is endemic to China.

References

dolicapax
Beetles described in 1992
Beetles of Asia
Endemic fauna of China